Hyacinth is a variant form of the given name Hyacinthe. The name is derived from a Greek word meaning the blue larkspur flower or the colour purple.

English variant forms include Hyacintha or Hyacinthia. European equivalents include Hyacinthe (French), Hyazinth (German), Jacek (Polish, male), Iakinf (Иакинф; Russian). The Spanish name Jacinta is closely related, referring to the hyacinth flower. Jacinda (Greek and Spanish) may refer to either.

Hyacinth may also refer to:

Men with the given name Hyacinth
 Hyacinth and Protus (martyred 257–9), Christian saints
 Hyacinth Bobone (c.1106–1198), after 1191 Pope Celestine III
 Hyacinth (Bichurin) (1777–1853), one of the founding fathers of Sinology
 Hyacinth Oroko Egbebo (born 1955), vicar and bishop
 Hyacinth Gabriel Connon (1911–1978), Lasallian Brother and a president of De La Salle University
 Hyacinth Graf Strachwitz von Groß-Zauche und Camminetz (1893–1968), German Army officer
 Hyacinth Morgan (1885–1956), Labour Party politician in the United Kingdom
 Hyacinth of Caesarea (died 108), early Christian martyr saint
 Hyacinth Tungutalum (1946–2009), Australian politician
 Saint Hyacinth (1185–1257), Polish priest, canonized 1594
 Hugh Hyacinth O'Rorke MacDermot (1834–1904), Irish lawyer

Mythology 
 Hyacinth (mythology), divine hero in Greek mythology

Fiction 
 Hyacinth Robinson, the main character of Henry James' 1886 novel The Princess Casamassima

Women with the given name Hyacinth
 Hyacinth Flemmings, former cricketer
 Hyacinth Mariscotti (also written Hyacintha or Giacinta), Italian saint
 Hyacinth Walters (born 1926), Jamaican former sprinter
 Hyacinth Wijeratne (1946-2021), Sri Lankan Sinhala actress

Fiction 
 Hyacinth Bucket, main character in the TV sitcom  Keeping Up Appearances
 Hyacinth Hippo, a character from the Disney movie Fantasia (1940 film)
 Hyacinth Bridgerton, character in the Netflix series Bridgerton

See also
 Hyacinth (disambiguation)
 Hyacinthe
 Jacek
 Jacinta
 St. Hyacinth (disambiguation)

People with the surname Hyacinth
 Flora Hyacinth (born 1966), retired female track and field athlete from the United States Virgin Islands

References

English-language unisex given names
Feminine given names
Given names derived from plants or flowers
Masculine given names